Epicaecilius pilipennis is a species of Psocoptera from the Caeciliusidae family that can be found in Great Britain and Ireland. The species are yellowish-black.

Habitat
The species feed on ash, beech, conifer, elm, gorse, oak, pine, spruce, and yew. Besides trees, it also likes fruits like horse chestnut.

References

Caeciliusidae
Insects described in 1996
Psocoptera of Europe